These are the complete filmographies for the cartoon shorts series created by American animation producer Fred Seibert from 1995 through 2022, at Hanna-Barbera Cartoons and his animation production companies Frederator Studios and FredFilms.

What A Cartoon! (aka World Premiere Toons) [1995–1997]
What A Cartoon! was producer Fred Seibert's first cartoon incubator, featuring 48 original animated shorts. Produced during Fred Seibert's presidency of Hanna-Barbera, and exhibited on Cartoon Network. The shorts are listed in the order that they originally aired.

The spin-off series were Dexter's Laboratory, Cow and Chicken, Johnny Bravo, I Am Weasel, Courage the Cowardly Dog, and The Powerpuff Girls.

Oh Yeah! Cartoons shorts [1998–2001] 
Oh Yeah! Cartoons was Fred Seibert's second cartoon incubator and Frederator Studios' first production, with 99 original shorts exhibited on Nickelodeon. The shorts are listed in the order that they originally aired.

The series spin-offs were The Fairly OddParents, ChalkZone, and My Life as a Teenage Robot.

Episodes

Season 1 (1998)
Hosted by various school kids from Brooklyn.

Season 2 (1999)
Hosted by Kenan Thompson.

Season 3 (2002)
Hosted by Josh Server.

Random! Cartoons [2008–2009] 
The original 39 Random! Cartoons shorts were supervised by series creator Fred Seibert and produced by Eric Homan and Kevin Kolde as Frederator Studios's third cartoon incubator. Exhibited on Nickelodeon. The shorts are listed in the order that they originally aired.

Spin-off series were Adventure Time (Cartoon Network), Fanboy & Chum Chum (Nickelodeon), and Bravest Warriors (Cartoon Hangover and Cartoon Hangover Select on VRV).

The Meth Minute 39 [2007–2008] 
The Meth Minute 39 had 39 original short cartoons and one bonus short, and was Frederator's fourth cartoon incubator. Production supervision was by series creator Fred Seibert, all individual cartoons were created by Dan Meth and produced by Carrie Miller, for exhibition on Channel Frederator. The shorts are listed in the order that they originally aired.

The spin-off series was "Nite Fite."

List of episodes

Too Cool! Cartoons [2013–2014] 
There were 11 Too Cool! Cartoons, Frederator Studios' fifth cartoon incubator, produced by Eric Homan and Kevin Kolde at Frederator Studios in Burbank. Exhibited at Cartoon Hangover. The shorts are listed in the order that they originally aired.

Spin-off series were Bee & PuppyCat (Cartoon Hangover and Netflix) and Dead End: Paranormal Park (Netflix).

GO! Cartoons [2017–2018] 
The 12 GO! Cartoons was Frederator Studios' sixth cartoon incubator, produced by Eric Homan and Kevin Kolde, in conjunction with Sony Pictures Animation. Exhibited at Cartoon Hangover and Cartoon Hangover Select  on Ellation's VRV subscription platform. The shorts are listed in the order that they originally aired.

Spin-off series will be announced in the second half of 2018.

Frederator Digital's Mini-Series [2018] 
Frederator Digital's Mini-Series are produced by Carrie Miller (executive produced by Fred Seibert) and exhibited on Cartoon Hangover Select on the VRV subscription platform.

Hot Pot! Cartoons [2022] 
Hot Pot! Cartoons will be Seibert's seventh shorts incubators, produced in association with DeZerlin Media in Qingdao, China. All 10 shorts will be exclusively created by Chinese filmmakers. Production is expected to be finished in late 2022.

References 

Filmographies